Plesiozela is genus of moths of the Heliozelidae family. It was described by Ole Karsholt and Niels P. Kristensen in 2003.

Species
 Plesiozela nielseni
 Plesiozela patagonica

References

Heliozelidae
Adeloidea genera